Linda Gray is an American actress.

Linda Gray may also refer to:

 Linda Gray (politician), Republican State Senator in Arizona
 Linda Gray Sexton (born 1953), American writer
 Linda Esther Gray (born 1948), Scottish soprano
 Linda Gary (1944–1995), American voice actress, sometimes credited as Linda Gray